Miguel Font Puig (born 6 August 1963) is an Andorran alpine skier. He competed in three events at the 1980 Winter Olympics. He is the brother of alpine skier Carlos Font.

Notes

References

External links
 
 
 

1963 births
Living people
Andorran male alpine skiers
Olympic alpine skiers of Andorra
Alpine skiers at the 1980 Winter Olympics
People from Andorra la Vella